Lepidoclema is a genus of beetles in the family Buprestidae, containing the following species:

 Lepidoclema magnum Bellamy & Holm, 1985
 Lepidoclema parvum Bellamy & Holm, 1985

References

Buprestidae genera